Kielce railway station is a railway station in Kielce, Świętokrzyskie Voivodeship (Holy Cross Province), Poland. According to the classification of passenger stations in Poland, it belongs to Voivodeship station. In 2018, the station served approximately 5,400 passengers a day.

History
The history of the station dates back to 1885, when it was opened on January 25, when the construction of the line linking Iwanogród (Dęblin) and Dąbrowa Górnicza was completed. During World War I, the Russians partially blew it up, but the railway station was rebuilt soon after by the Austrians who occupied the city in a slightly changed form. During the war in 1939, one of the wings and the front part from the track side were damaged. The damage was repaired by the Germans, removing details from the façade and changing the shape of the windows. The building existed in this form until 1966. Five years later, in 1971, a new station building with greater functionality than the previous one, which still stands, was put into use.

Train services
Currently, Kielce is an important intersection of railway lines, running to Częstochowa and Lubliniec, Warsaw, Kraków and Sandomierz.

The station is served by the following service(s):

Intercity services (TLK) Kołobrzeg — Gdynia Główna — Warszawa Wschodnia — Kraków Główny
 Regional services (PR) Częstochowa - Włoszczowa - Kielce
 Regional services (PR) Częstochowa - Włoszczowa - Kielce - Busko-Zdrój

Bus services
In the vicinity of the train station (exactly on Żelazna Street), there are 2 stops served by a total of 7 bus lines (33, 34, 44, 45, 54, 100, N2). The Kielce Bus Station is located near the train station, which was put into use again in 2020 after reconstruction.

References

External links
 

Railway stations in Poland opened in 1885
Railway stations in Świętokrzyskie Voivodeship
Buildings and structures in Kielce